Robert J. Odegard (December 22, 1920 – September 20, 2013) was an American businessman and politician.

Life and career
Born in Princeton, Minnesota, Odegard served in the United States Navy during World War II. He received his bachelor's degree in agricultural economics from University of Minnesota. He was the manager of the family business and the executive director of the University of Minnesota Foundation. Odegard served in the Minnesota House of Representatives in 1961 and 1962 as a Republican. He ran for the United States House of Representatives in 1962 and 1964 and lost the elections. He died in Naples, Florida.

Notes

1920 births
2013 deaths
People from Princeton, Minnesota
University of Minnesota College of Food, Agricultural and Natural Resource Sciences alumni
Republican Party members of the Minnesota House of Representatives
American businesspeople
United States Navy personnel of World War II